Le Perréon is a commune in the Rhône department in eastern France.

See also
Communes of the Rhône department
Château Grand'Grange

References

Communes of Rhône (department)